North Korea competed at the 2019 World Athletics Championships in Doha, Qatar, from 27 September to 6 October 2019.

Results

Women 
Track and road events

References

Nations at the 2019 World Athletics Championships
World Championships in Athletics
2019